Football Club Pirin Razlog is a Bulgarian football club based in Razlog, that competes in the South-West Third League.

History
The club was founded as Pirin in 2002. In their second season, they were promoted to South-Western V Group (third tier) as champions of the Regional Group - Blagoevgrad.

In 2010, Ivan Stoychev had been appointed as a manager of Pirin 2002. In 2011–12 season, the club won promotion for the B Group for first time in the club's history.

On 24 June 2016 Pirin merged into PFC Septemvri Sofia. In August 2016 the restored club merged with Malesh Mikrevo and from the new season 2016/17 Pirin will compete in the new Third Southwestern League, the third division of Bulgarian football.

Honours
 Nineteenth place in the "B" group: 1990/91 (as Pirin).
 Twice the 1/32 finals of the tournament for the National Cup: this time its official name is the Cup of Bulgaria - 1990/91 (as Pirin) and 2010/11

League positions

Current squad

References

External links
 Pirin Razlog at Bulgarian Club Directory

Pirin 2002
2002 establishments in Bulgaria